RI Irian (201), previously named Ordzhonikidze was a , Soviet designation "Project 68bis", of the Soviet Navy that was acquired by Indonesian Navy in the 1960s.

Development and design 

The Sverdlov-class cruisers, Soviet designation Project 68bis, were the last conventional gun cruisers built for the Soviet Navy. They were built in the 1950s and were based on Soviet, German, and Italian designs and concepts developed prior to the Second World War. They were modified to improve their sea keeping capabilities, allowing them to run at high speed in the rough waters of the North Atlantic. The basic hull was more modern and had better armor protection than the vast majority of the post Second World War gun cruiser designs built and deployed by peer nations. They also carried an extensive suite of modern radar equipment and anti-aircraft artillery. The Soviets originally planned to build 40 ships in the class, which would be supported by the s and aircraft carriers.

The Sverdlov class displaced 13,600 tons standard and 16,640 tons at full load. They were  long overall and  long at the waterline. They had a beam of  and draught of  and typically had a complement of 1,250. The hull was a completely welded new design and the ships had a double bottom for over 75% of their length. The ship also had twenty-three watertight bulkheads. The Sverdlovs had six boilers providing steam to two shaft geared steam turbines generating . This gave the ships a maximum speed of . The cruisers had a range of  at .

Sverdlov-class cruisers main armament included twelve /57 cal B-38 guns mounted in four triple Mk5-bis turrets. They also had twelve /56 cal Model 1934 guns in six twin SM-5-1 mounts. For anti-aircraft weaponry, the cruisers had thirty-two  anti-aircraft guns in sixteen twin mounts and were also equipped with ten  torpedo tubes in two mountings of five each.

The Sverdlovs had  belt armor and had a  armored deck. The turrets were shielded by  armor and the conning tower, by  armor.

The cruisers' ultimate radar suite included one 'Big Net' or 'Top Trough' air search radar, one 'High Sieve' or 'Low Sieve' air search radar, one 'Knife Rest' air search radar and one 'Slim Net' air search radar. For navigational radar they had one 'Don-2' or 'Neptune' model. For fire control purposes the ships were equipped with two 'Sun Visor' radars, two 'Top Bow' 152 mm gun radars and eight 'Egg Cup' gun radars. For electronic countermeasures the ships were equipped with two 'Watch Dog' ECM systems.

Operational history

Ordzhonikidze

In April 1956 the ship docked at Portsmouth; aboard were Nikita Khrushchev and Nikolai Bulganin. Former Royal Navy diver Lionel Crabb was recruited to observe the Ordzhonikidze but went missing. 

After a deal with the PRC fell through due to the Sino-Soviet Split, Ordzhonikidze was sold to Indonesia in 1962.

Irian
RI Irian arrived in Surabaya in October 1962 and later it was declared decommissioned from service by the Soviet Navy on 24 January 1963.

In the mid-1960s, following the abortive coup by the 30 September Movement and the subsequent transition from President Sukarno to President Suharto, the RI Irian was extensively used as a floating detention center in Surabaya for suspected communists, especially during the anti-communist purges perpetrated by the Armed Forces in retaliation to the abortive coup. Ties between Eastern Bloc countries and Suharto's New Order regime promptly deteriorated, leading to the flow of spare parts for the ship being cut.

Accounts differ regarding the fate of RI Irian. One account states that in 1970, the ship's condition had deteriorated due to lack of maintenance that she began to flood with water. Eventually, when Admiral Sudomo became Chief of Staff of the Indonesian Navy, the ship was sent to Taiwan for dismantling in 1972. Another account from Hendro Subroto, an Indonesian war journalist, states that the ship was sold to Japan after being stripped of its weapons, despite the presence of two remaining spare parts warehouses in Tanjung Priok.

Pennant numbers

References

Bibliography
 
 

Sverdlov-class cruisers
1950 ships
Ships built in the Soviet Union
Ships built at Admiralty Shipyard
Ships of the Indonesian Navy
Cold War cruisers of the Soviet Union
Indonesia–Soviet Union relations